Labelle, LaBelle or La Belle is a family name of French and French-Canadian origins. It may refer to:

Places
Labelle, Quebec
Labelle, Nova Scotia
Labelle (electoral district), a federal riding in Quebec
Labelle (provincial electoral district), another, provincial riding also in Quebec
Labelle County, Quebec, a former county
Antoine-Labelle Regional County Municipality, Quebec
Papineau-Labelle Wildlife Reserve, Quebec.
LaBelle, Florida
LaBelle, Pennsylvania, Luzerne Township, Fayette County, Pennsylvania
LaBelle, Texas
La Belle Station, Northern Territory, Australia

People
Antoine Labelle
Chuck Labelle
Doug LaBelle II
James W. LaBelle
Jean-Baptiste Labelle
Jean-Baptiste Labelle (politician)
Marc LaBelle
Patti LaBelle

Other
Labelle, a former American R&B and soul group
Labelle (album), the group's 1972 eponymous debut

See also 

 Labille, a similarly spelled surname